County Cork  was a constituency represented in the Irish House of Commons until its abolition on 1 January 1801.

Area
This constituency consisted of County Cork. It returned two members to the Parliament of Ireland up to 1800.

History
In the Patriot Parliament of 1689 summoned by James II, Cork County was represented with two members. Following the Act of Union 1800 the borough retained two parliamentary seats in the United Kingdom House of Commons.

Members of Parliament
1585: April. Sir John Norreys, knt. William Cogan, Esq. John Fitzgerald, Esq., of Cloyne.
1613: 19 April. Dermod McCarthy, Esq., of Lohort. Andrew Barrett, Esq., of Ballincollig.
1634: 23 June. Sir William St. Leger, knt., of Doneraile. Sir Donagh McCarthy, knt.
1639: 2 March. Sir William St Leger, knt., of Doneraile. Donagh McCarthy, knt.
1641: 20 February. Redmond Roche (MP) in place of Donagh McCarthy, who succeeded his father as 2nd Viscount of Muskerry.
1641: 22 June. Redmond Roche, of Cahirduggan, expelled for siding with the 1641 Rebellion.
1642: 2 July. ? in place of William St Leger who died.
1661: 25 April. Hon. Richard Boyle. Sir Henry Tynte, knt., of Roxhall.
1661: 2 June. Sir John Perceval, 1st Baronet of Burton, in place of Tynte, deceased.
1665: 7 December. Roger Boyle, in place of Richard Boyle, translated to the Lords.  
1665-1666: John St Ledger (d.31 March 1696).

1689–1801

Notes

References

Bibliography
 – Parliaments & Biographies (PDF downloaded from given URL)

Johnston-Liik, E. M. (2002). History of the Irish Parliament, 1692–1800, Publisher: Ulster Historical Foundation (28 Feb 2002),  
T. W. Moody, F. X. Martin, F. J. Byrne, A New History of Ireland 1534-1691, Oxford University Press, 1978
Tim Cadogan and Jeremiah Falvey, A Biographical Dictionary of Cork, 2006, Four Courts Press 

Constituencies of the Parliament of Ireland (pre-1801)
Historic constituencies in County Cork
1800 disestablishments in Ireland
Constituencies disestablished in 1800